Sarajabad (also Romanized as Sarājābād; also known as Sorkhreh) is a village in Shabankareh Rural District, Shabankareh District, Dashtestan County, Bushehr Province, Iran. At the 2006 census, its population was 702, in 143 families.

References 

Populated places in Dashtestan County